Unit 217, frequently called Duvdevan, is a mistaʽaravim unit in the Commando Brigade of the Israel Defense Forces.

It is notable for its undercover operations in urban areas, during which its operators often wear civilian clothing to disguise themselves among the local Arab populace. The unit is also known to have highly trained members in both human and mechanical counter-surveillance. Unlike other special forces, they can operate independently in more than one place at a time. Unit 217 performs many high-risk and complicated operations, including targeted killings of terrorists and a range of other undercover operations in Arab regions, many of which are classified.

History
According to the Israel Defense Forces (IDF), Unit 217 was established in June 1986 to deal with "security events" in the West Bank, especially in its densely populated civilian areas. During the 2015–2016 violence wave, the unit was involved in the arrests of the killers of Eitam and Naʽama Henkin, Hafna Meir, and rabbi Yaʽakov Littman (sometimes spelled Litman) and his son. For its work during this period, Unit 217 received the Israeli Chief of Staff citation.

Upon joining the Commando Brigade, Unit 217 expanded its operational activities.

Organization and mission

The unit is part of the "Oz" 89th Commando Brigade (a brigade dedicated solely to special operations), but Duvdevan operators undergo basic training in the Paratroopers Brigade. Unit 217 is most similar to the Yamas unit of the Israel Border Police.

Equipment

 Jericho 941 semi-automatic pistol 
 M89SR sniper rifle
 M24 Sniper Weapon System – sniper system
 M4 carbine with 10" barrel
 Remington 870 combat shotgun
 Para Micro-Uzi submachine gun 
 IMI Negev machine gun
 Shipon multi-purpose rocket-launcher
 Mk 47 Striker automatic grenade launcher
 Glock 17/19C
combat knife

See also
 Israeli Special Forces Units
 Kidon
 Samson Unit
 Heroes for life

References

Further reading

External links
 Garret Machine

Infantry of Israel
Special forces of Israel
Counterterrorist organizations
Military units and formations established in 1986